is a passenger railway station located in the city of Sayama, Saitama, Japan, operated by the private railway operator Seibu Railway.

Lines
Sayamashi Station is served by the Seibu Shinjuku Line between Seibu-Shinjuku Station in Tokyo and Hon-Kawagoe Station in Kawagoe, and is located 38.6 km from the terminus at Seibu-Shinjuku. All services (Koedo, Commuter Express, Express, Semi Express, and Local) stop at this station.

Station layout
The station consists of two side platforms serving two tracks, with an elevated station building located above the platforms.

Platforms

History
The station opened on 21 March 1895. Station numbering was introduced on all Seibu Railway lines during fiscal 2012, with Sayamashi Station becoming "SS26".

Passenger statistics
In fiscal 2019, the station was the 23rd busiest on the Seibu network with an average of 41,050 passengers daily.

The passenger figures for previous years are as shown below.

Surrounding area
 Sayama City Office
 Sayama Central Library
 Sayama Technical High School

References

External links

 Sayamashi Station information (Seibu Railway) 

Railway stations in Saitama Prefecture
Railway stations in Japan opened in 1895
Stations of Seibu Railway
Sayama